Hepatitis B virus PRE 1151–1410 (HBV post-transcriptional regulatory element, nucleotides 1151–1410) is a part of 500 base pair long  HBV PRE, that has been proposed to be the hepatitis B virus (HBV) RNA export element. However, the function is controversial and new regulatory elements have been predicted within PRE. PRE 1151–1410 enhances nuclear export of intronless transcripts and represses the splicing mechanism to a comparable degree to that of the full-length PRE. Hence it was proposed to be the core HBV PRE element. PRE1151–1410 contains 3 known regulatory elements: PRE SL-alpha (nucleotides 1292–1321), human La protein binding site (nucleotide 1275–1291), SRE-1 (nucleotides 1252–1348).

See also 
 HBV PRE SL alpha
 HBV PRE SL beta
 HBV RNA encapsidation signal epsilon

References 

RNA
Non-coding RNA